Bahaba is a genus of fish in the family Sciaenidae.

Species
The currently recognized species in this genus are:
 Bahaba chaptis F. Hamilton, 1822 (Chaptis bahaba)
 Bahaba polykladiskos Bleeker, 1897 (spine bahaba)
 Bahaba taipingensis Herre, 1932 (Chinese bahaba)

References

 
Sciaenidae
Taxonomy articles created by Polbot